Two Tickets to Broadway is a 1951 American musical film directed by James V. Kern and filmed on the RKO Forty Acres backlot. It was nominated for an Academy Award for Best Sound Recording (John O. Aalberg). The film was choreographed by Busby Berkeley. The film recorded an estimated loss of $1,150,000.

Plot
Frustrated singers Hannah Holbrook, Joyce Campbell, and S. F. "Foxy" Rogers return dejectedly to New York on a bus, their out-of-town engagement in Vermont, arranged by small-time promoter Lew Conway, having been a huge flop.

Nancy Peterson, another passenger on the bus, mistakenly believes Dan Carter has stolen her suitcase. It turns out both are entertainers. They end up with each other's bags, then become better acquainted after the mix-up.

The conniving Lew represents Dan and tries to get him to take the same bad gig the girl singers just left. Lew also meets a couple of delicatessen owners, Leo and Harry, who might have money to invest in his performers' careers. The agent has an impersonator, Glendon, pretend to be the producer of bandleader Bob Crosby's television program.

Everybody excitedly believes that Lew has booked them on the TV show. Lew continually tries to get in to see Crosby's actual producer, totally in vain. He lies to the singers that Crosby won't book them because he is jealous of Dan's ability as a singer. A furious Nancy barges into the TV studio to berate Crosby and his producer, who have no idea what she is talking about.

Nancy boards a bus, headed back home. Crosby's producer, however, says he's been interested in Dan for quite a while, and ends up with an opening on tonight's show after Lew locks the scheduled performers in a closet. Nancy refuses to believe Lew that the gang really is performing on tonight's show, until she spots Dan singing on a TV in a store's window. She races back to New York just in time to join the others on the show.

Cast
 Tony Martin as Dan Carter
 Janet Leigh as Nancy Peterson
 Gloria DeHaven as Hannah Holbrook
 Eddie Bracken as Lew Conway
 Ann Miller as Joyce Campbell
 Barbara Lawrence as S. F. Rogers
 Bob Crosby as himself
 Charles Dale as Leo, Palace Deli
 Joe Smith as Harry, Palace Deli
 Taylor Holmes as Willard Glendon
 Buddy Baer as Sailor on Bus
 Kathleen O'Malley as  Showgirl
The roles of the two delicatessen owners were originally offered to Stan Laurel and Oliver Hardy, who had to turn down the parts due to Laurel being ill. The comedy team of Smith and Dale got the roles instead.

References

External links
 
 
 
 

1951 films
1951 musical films
American musical films
Films about musical theatre
Films directed by James V. Kern
Films produced by Howard Hughes
Films scored by Walter Scharf
RKO Pictures films
1950s English-language films
1950s American films